Ohuchi Dam is a gravity dam located in Akita Prefecture in Japan. The dam is used for flood control and water supply. The catchment area of the dam is 3.4 km2. The dam impounds about 13  ha of land when full and can store 724 thousand cubic meters of water. The construction of the dam was started on 1991 and completed in 2007.

References

Dams in Akita Prefecture
2007 establishments in Japan